Martinice is a municipality and village in Kroměříž District in the Zlín Region of the Czech Republic. It has about 800 inhabitants.

History
The first written mention of Martinice is from 1262.

References

Villages in Kroměříž District